Modoc High School may refer to:

 Modoc High School (Alturas, California)
 Union High School (Modoc), Indiana